Prajapati Halt railway station is a railway station on Muzaffarpur–Gorakhpur main line under the Samastipur railway division of East Central Railway zone. This is situated beside Bagaha Dhala Road at Chawani, Bettiah in West Champaran district of the Indian state of Bihar.

References

Railway stations in West Champaran district
Samastipur railway division